One Records may refer to:

One Records (Scotland), a record label based in Scotland
One Records (Serbia), a record label based in Serbia